Aristonectes (meaning 'best swimmer') is an extinct genus of plesiosaur from the Late Cretaceous Paso del Sapo Formation of what is now Argentina, the Quiriquina Formation of Chile and the Lopez de Bertodano Formation of Antarctica. The type species is Aristonectes parvidens, first named by Cabrera in 1941.

Description 

A rough estimate based on the specimen from the Lopez de Bertodano Formation (identified as cf.

Classification 

Aristonectes was classified variously since its original 1941 description, but a 2003 review of plesiosaurs from Patagonia conducted by Gasparini et al. (2003) found that Aristonectes was most closely related to elasmosaurid plesiosaurs like Elasmosaurus. The authors also considered Morturneria a junior synonym of Aristonectes because the former's holotype has unfused neural arches of the vertebrae indicative of juvenile status. Subsequent study, however, revalidated Morturneria based on non-ontogenetic differences from Aristonectes.

Aristonectes was placed within its own family, Aristonectidae, along with Tatenectes, Kaiwhekea, and Kimmerosaurus, by O'Keefe and Street (2009), as sister family of the polycotylid cryptoclidoids. However, subsequent studies (Otero et al., 2014) returned Aristonectes to Elasmosauridae, recovering the genus as a derived elasmosaurid and therefore relegating Aristonectidae to a subfamily of Elasmosauridae, as Aristonectinae.

See also 

 List of plesiosaur genera
 Timeline of plesiosaur research

Notes

References

External links 

 Taxonomic history of Aristonectes

Late Cretaceous plesiosaurs
Maastrichtian life
Late Cretaceous reptiles of South America
Plesiosaurs of South America
Cretaceous Argentina
Fossils of Argentina
Cañadón Asfalto Basin
Cretaceous Chile
Fossils of Chile
Cretaceous Antarctica
Fossils of Antarctica
Fossil taxa described in 1941
Sauropterygian genera